Data Integrity Field (DIF) is an approach to protect data integrity in computer data storage from data corruption.  It was proposed in 2003 by the T10 subcommittee of the International Committee for Information Technology Standards. A similar approach for data integrity was added in 2016 to the NVMe 1.2.1 specification.

Packet-based storage transport protocols have CRC protection on command and data payloads. Interconnect buses have parity protection. Memory systems have parity detection/correction schemes. I/O protocol controllers at the transport/interconnect boundaries have internal data path protection.
Data availability in storage systems is frequently measured simply in terms of the reliability of the hardware components and the effects of redundant hardware. But the reliability of the software, its ability to detect errors, and its ability to correctly report or apply corrective actions to a failure have a significant bearing on the overall storage system availability.
The data exchange usually takes place between the host CPU and storage disk. There may be a storage data controller in between these two. The controller could be RAID controller or simple storage switches.

DIF included extending the disk sector from its traditional 512 bytes, to 520 bytes, by adding eight additional protection bytes.
This extended sector is defined for Small Computer System Interface (SCSI) devices, which is in turn used in many enterprise storage technologies, such as Fibre Channel.
Oracle Corporation included support for DIF in the Linux kernel.

An evolution of this technology called T10 Protection Information was introduced in 2011.

References

External links 
 Linux Data Integrity, August 30, 2008, Oracle Corporation, by Martin K. Petersen (archived from the original on January 9, 2015)
 Linux Storage Topology and Advanced Features, November 24, 2009, by Martin K. Petersen
 Data Integrity Field - T10.org, working on Feb 15 2019.

Error detection and correction